The 2017–18 Biathlon World Cup – Stage 4 was the 4th event of the season and was held in Oberhof, Germany, from 4 January until 7 January 2018.

Schedule of events

Medal winners

Men

Women

References 

Biathlon World Cup - Stage 4, 2017-18
2017–18 Biathlon World Cup
Biathlon World Cup - Stage 4
Biathlon competitions in Germany